Linyi University (LYU) is a public university based in Lanshan district of Linyi, Shandong province, China. It offers studies in 62 different undergraduate degrees, organized among nine major disciplines: Economics, Law, Education, Literature, History, Science, Engineering, Agriculture and Management.

History
The predecessor school of Linyi University, Seaside High School of the Military and Political College, was founded in 1941. It was one of the first universities in Shandong, taking the name of Linyi University in 1958. Yet the institution was transformed into a teachers school just one year later. Through the following decades it kept the profile of an institution for teachers education, and was known as Linyi Normal University after 1999. The college was awarded with name change in 2010 by Ministry of Education, People's Republic of China.

External links
 Linyi University website 
 Linyi University website 

Universities and colleges in Shandong
Linyi